Mario Rivera may refer to:

 Mario Orozco Rivera (1930–1998), Mexican muralist and painter
 Mario Rivera (football manager) (born 1977), Spanish football manager
 Mario Rivera (musician) (1939–2007), Dominican Republic musician, composer and arranger
 Mario Rivera (volleyball) (born 1982), Cuban volleyball player
 Mario Rivera Martino, (1924–2017), Puerto Rican journalist